Miss America's Outstanding Teen 2020 was the 14th annual Miss America's Outstanding Teen pageant held in Orlando, Florida on July 27, 2019. The preliminary competition was held on July 23-25, 2019.

London Hibbs of Texas crowned her successor, Payton May of Washington, at the end of the event.

Judges
The panel of judges for the 2020 preliminary and final night of competition will include:
Caitlin Brunell-Moore, Miss America's Outstanding Teen 2008 and Miss Alabama 2014
Willie L. Hill, Jr., Director of the Fine Arts Center at the University of Massachusetts Amherst
Margot Menzel, talent manager at Luber Roklin Entertainment
Susan Davis Baldino, professor of museum studies at Florida State University and disabilities advocate
Candace M. Read, wardrobe stylist and blogger
Jeffrey C. McDermott, President/CEO of Center for the Performing Arts in Carmel, Indiana

Placements

§ America's Choice

Order of announcements

Top 15

Top 10

Top 5

Awards

Preliminary awards

Talent awards

Other awards

Contestants
The Miss America's Outstanding Teen 2020 contestants are:

References

2020